Serenj Dakh (also Romanized as Serenj Dākh; also known as Sīrīnj Dāgh) is a village in Khvor Khvoreh Rural District, Ziviyeh District, Saqqez County, Kurdistan Province, Iran. At the 2006 census, its population was 149, in 21 families. The village is populated by Kurds.

References 

Towns and villages in Saqqez County
Kurdish settlements in Kurdistan Province